The Erdemli Shooting Range is a firing range located in Erdemli district of Mersin Province, Turkey. It was constructed for the 2013 Mediterranean Games.

It is also suitable for skeet and trap shootings. It hosted the shooting events of 2013 Mediterranean Games on June 23–28.

References

Sports venues completed in 2013
2013 Mediterranean Games venues
Shooting ranges in Turkey
Sports venues in Mersin
Indoor arenas in Turkey
Erdemli District